Henry of Latvia (1187 – after 1259), also known in the English-speaking world as Henry of Livonia, was a priest, missionary and historian. He wrote the Livonian Chronicle of Henry which describes the evangelization of the regions which are now part of Estonia and Latvia during the Northern Crusades.

Biography
The chronicles say that Henry was a Catholic priest who witnessed most of events described. Henry is thought to have been born in 1187 in Magdeburg. Henry was probably German,but many historians count him as Latvian, who has been brought up in German family bearing a German, forename and consistently referring to Germans as "we", but it is also possible that he came from Livonia. He had a thoroughly German and Catholic education and as a youth was attached to the household of the Prince-Bishop Albert of Buxhoeveden (c.1165 – 17 January 1229), was ordained a priest in 1208, founded a parish and lived out his life in peace.

Henry's Chronicles, compiled around 1229, are written from a clerical point of view, that the history of the Church was the essential history of Livonia. The Chronicles may have originated as a report to the papal legate, William of Modena, to whom he was assigned as interpreter 1225 through 1227. The legate, one of the papacy's most able diplomats, was in Livonia to mediate an internal church dispute between the Livonian Brothers of the Sword, and the territorial claims of the Catholic bishops of Livonia.

He was mentioned in documents published in 1231 and 1259 as being a priest. Henry died after 1259 in Papendorf, Livonia, aged at least 72. He lived in Rubene until at least 1259, when he was questioned as a witness in a dispute over the boundaries of the archdiocese and the order at Lake Burtnieki and Salaca. During this time he was called Lord Indrica of the parish of Papendorf (dominus Hinricus plebanus de Papendorpe).

References

External links 
 Letonika.lv profile 

1180s births
1260s deaths
Writers from Magdeburg
German chroniclers
13th-century German Roman Catholic priests
German Roman Catholic missionaries
13th-century historians from the Holy Roman Empire
Baltic-German people
Christians of the Livonian Crusade
German male non-fiction writers
Roman Catholic missionaries in Estonia
Roman Catholic missionaries in Latvia
13th-century German writers
13th-century Latin writers